The  Jim Stynes Bridge is a pedestrian bridge over the Yarra River at Docklands precinct in Melbourne, Victoria, Australia.

The new bridge provides a vital link for pedestrians, cyclists and commuters between Melbourne's CBD, and the key precincts of Docklands and Northbank. Designed as a horizontal suspension bridge, it arcs out 30 metres over the river and creates the illusion it is hovering unsupported above it, passing under the Charles Grimes Bridge.

The bridge was named after Jim Stynes, a prominent Ireland-born player of Australian rules football who died in 2012. Two bronze plaques outlining Stynes' achievements are installed at each end of the bridge.

References

Bridges completed in 2014
2014 establishments in Australia
Suspension bridges in Australia
Pedestrian bridges in Melbourne
Steel bridges in Australia
Yarra River
Buildings and structures in the City of Melbourne (LGA)
Transport in the City of Melbourne (LGA)